Big Bottom (1878–1887) is a ghost town in Meade County, South Dakota, United States.

History
Big Bottom was founded in 1878 by Thomas D. Pryor. He built a two-story frame house for himself and added a dance hall and saloon, both of which became very well known to the locals. In 1880, a post office was established, and a school soon followed. However, the anticipated railroad bypassed the town, and in 1887, the store and saloon closed their doors. Today, the town is completely abandoned, and little remains.

Geography
Big Bottom is located on the Great Plains in western Meade County, South Dakota. The only remaining structure is the basement foundation of Pryor's house.

References

Ghost towns in South Dakota
Populated places established in 1878
1878 establishments in Dakota Territory
Populated places disestablished in 1887
1887 disestablishments in the United States
Geography of Meade County, South Dakota